Stanislaus von Moos (born 23 July 1940) is a Swiss art historian and architectural theorist.

Early life
Stanislaus von Moos was born in Lucerne, Switzerland.

Career
After first teaching in Harvard, Bern and New York, he became a professor at the Delft University of Technology in 1983. He then worked at the newly created Department of Modern and Contemporary Art in Zurich, where he taught until his retirement in 2005. He then settled in Mendrisio, and currently teaches at Yale.

In 1971 he founded the still existing magazine " Archithese " . Since 1997 he was Visiting Professor Jean Labatut in Princeton.

He was awarded the Schelling Architecture Theory Prize for 1998.

Personal life
Stanislaus von Moos is married to sculptor Irène von Moos. His uncle was the Lucerne painter Max von Moos.

Bibliography
 Le Corbusier – elements of a synthesis, (1968), Le Corbusier, une synthèse, Marseille, Parenthèses, 2014 
The American architect Robert Venturi 
 Published essay collection on Swiss architecture and art in the 20th Century

References

1940 births
Living people
Swiss art historians
Swiss architectural historians
People from Lucerne
Harvard University staff
Swiss expatriates in the United States
Swiss expatriates in the Netherlands